Chahardeh-ye Pain (also Romanized as Chahārdeh-e Pā’īn; also known as Chārdeh-ye Pā’īn, Chahār Deh, Char Deh Bālā, and Chehārdeh) is a village in Baqeran Rural District, in the Central District of Birjand County, South Khorasan Province, Iran. At the 2006 census, its population was 29, in 10 families.

References 

Populated places in Birjand County